Fay Barbara King (March 1889 – presumed dead [after 1954]) was an American illustrator, journalist, and cartoonist. Some of her work represents an early example of autobiographical comics.

King worked for newspapers and magazines in the early twentieth century (at least from 1912 to 1937), moving to New York City in 1918. She was one of the popular Jazz Age cartoonists appearing in the 1924 comedy The Great White Way.

Biography 
King was born in Seattle, Washington in March 1889, to John and Ella King. She was raised in Portland, Oregon, and went to college at Seattle University. The young King was adventurous, being one of the first women in the Portland area to own an automobile, and in 1912 had announced plans for a balloon ascension with noted early parachutist Georgia "Tiny" Broadwick, before the plan was rejected by her parents, according to an article in The Oregonian.

King's father had been an employee at a Turkish bath, as well a trainer of athletes, and she seems to have had a deep affinity for sport. King married boxer Oscar "Battling" Nelson in 1913, in the Hegewisch neighborhood of Chicago. Their 1916 divorce was widely covered by the press. The Veteran Boxing Association paid for part of the cost of Nelson's 1954 funeral; King paid the remainder, in addition to purchasing "beautiful arrangements" for the ceremony.

King worked for The Denver Post from April 1912 to 1918, leaving for The San Francisco Examiner. She later became feature writer and cartoonist for the New York Evening Journal.

In 1924, she appeared as herself in the comedy The Great White Way (alongside other cartoonists, such as Winsor McCay and George McManus).

Work
King's cartoons are recalled as an early example of autobiographical comics within the genre of newspaper cartooning. She frequently depicted herself in her comics, using a spindly, gangly caricature that bore a strong resemblance to the character of Olive Oyl, who would later be created by E.C. Segar for his Thimble Theater strip.

In addition to her autobiographical reporting, she is known to have created two strips, both of which ran in the New-York Mirror: "Mazie" (which ran briefly in 1924) and "Girls Will Be Girls" (which ran between 1924 and 1925).

References

Further reading
 Trina Robbins, Nell Brinkley and the New Woman in the Early 20th Century (2001), McFarland and Company, Inc.
 Trina Robbins, A Century of Women Cartoonists (1993), Kitchen Sink Press

External links
Scrapbook, compiled by cartoonist and journalist, Fay King, 1916–1919 (from Digital Library@Villanova University)
Articles about Fay King
 2008 profile, by Marilyn Slater, Looking for Mabel
 2013 profile, by Allan Holtz, Stripper's Guide
 2017 profile, by Dick Kreck, The Denver Post

Databases about Fay King
 Fay King at Lambiek Comiclopedia (minibio)
  (for A Century of Women Cartoonists)
  (for The Great White Way)

Articles by Fay King
 "Fay King Says Chop Sticks Should Have Hooks on Ends" (text and scan), Syracuse Evening Telegram, December 16, 1922

1889 births
American women illustrators
American illustrators
American comic strip cartoonists
American female comics artists
Female comics writers
Artists from Portland, Oregon
Seattle University alumni
Date of birth missing
Year of death missing
Place of death missing
Artists from Seattle